The Girl on the Stairs is the 5th psychological crime thriller by Scottish author Louise Welsh. The book was first published in 2012 by publisher John Murray. Welsh's first novel, The Cutting Room, won several literary prizes.

Plot summary
This psychological thriller is set in Berlin. It revolves around the central character, Jane, who has recently moved from Glasgow to the city with her lover Petra. As Jane adjusts to her new life and pregnancy she becomes curious about the neighbour’s daughter Anna, the arguments she hears through the wall and Anna’s strange appearance on the stairs.

Critical reception
As the plot unravels, this latest psychological thriller from Louise Welsh leaves the reader constantly guessing between what is real and what could be Jane’s imagination. According to one reviewer, Welsh skilfully moulded the plot into some fresh and horrible terrain."
  The Guardian and Observer reviewer described this novel as a "psychologically potent cross between The Yellow Wallpaper and Rear Window.".

Other Works by Louise Welsh
The Cutting Room (2002)
Tamburlaine Must Die (2004)
The Bullet Trick (2006)
Naming The Bones (2010)

References

External links
Louise Welsh's Official Site
Louise Welsh Books

Novels by Louise Welsh
2012 British novels
Novels set in Berlin
2010s LGBT novels
Psychological thriller novels
John Murray (publishing house) books
2012 LGBT-related literary works